Scammonden Bridge, also known locally as the Brown Cow Bridge (after the nearby Brown Cow Inn, now closed), spans the Deanhead cutting carrying the B6114 (the former A6025) Elland to Buckstones road over the M62 motorway in Kirklees,  West Yorkshire, England. The bridge and Scammonden Reservoir to the west are named after Scammonden, the village that was flooded to accommodate the reservoir whose dam carries the motorway. On opening, the bridge was the longest concrete arch bridge in the UK.

History
The bridge was built for the West Riding County Council to the designs of the county surveyor, Colonel S. Maynard Lovell. In March 1962 a model of the  section of the M62 was displayed in Wakefield, the administrative centre of the West Riding County Council. The route of the motorway, from the A572 to the A640 at Huddersfield, was announced by Tom Fraser on 29 October 1964.

On opening, it was believed to be one of the largest concrete single spans in Europe.

The bridge had high winds; pedestrians found it sometimes hard to walk along it, so a new type of road sign, for high winds, was installed.

Design
The bridge was planned as a flat arch bridge, but aerodynamic considerations led to an open spandrel design. The main span supports eight spandrel columns and there are four other columns over the motorway cutting.

The arch is a twin box section. Its deck is an inverted T-type pretensioned prestressed concrete beam. Using computers, its design was calculated to withstand  winds, and was tested in wind tunnels at the University of Nottingham and the National Physical Laboratory. The motorway cutting was profiled with  'steps'.

The road it carried was the A6025, but is now the B6114 between Elland and the A640 junction at Buckstones Moss. To the west of the bridge the M62 enters Calderdale from Kirklees; the boundary crosses the B6114 north of the bridge, and follows the north side of the M62 along Scammonden Water.

Safety improvements
Work began in June, nearly a year after Highways England confirmed they had secured the £1m required to design and build the new structures. The scheme was completed in October 2020.

Construction

The arch is made of modular precast concrete sections, weighing . The construction contractor was Alfred McAlpine. Construction of the arch required  of scaffolding tubing. During the winter there was severe ice build up on the scaffolding; the scaffolding had 70 miles of steel tubing.

Excavation of the Deanhead cutting was done using explosives; 12,000,000 cubic yards were excavated.

The route of the carriageway was set out in July 1963 and the motorway cutting began work in August 1964. Work on the six-mile Windy Hill to Pole Moor section began on 1 November 1966 and was carried out for 12 hours on weekdays and eight hours at weekends.

See also
 List of bridges in the United Kingdom
 List of longest arch bridge spans
 List of longest masonry arch bridge spans

References

External links

 CBRD
 Motorway Archive
 SABRE Roads
 A6025
 Bridge construction
 Construction

Video clips
 Construction
 Sunset timelapse from the bridge
 View from the east along the M62
 View from the west
 View from the top

Arch bridges in the United Kingdom
Bridges in West Yorkshire
Buildings and structures in Kirklees
Bridges completed in 1970
Concrete bridges in the United Kingdom
Motorway bridges in England
Open-spandrel deck arch bridges
M62 motorway